Joseph Robertson (born 12 April 1977) is a Scottish former footballer who played for Clydebank, Dumbarton and East Stirlingshire.

References

1977 births
Scottish footballers
Dumbarton F.C. players
Clydebank F.C. (1965) players
East Stirlingshire F.C. players
Scottish Football League players
Living people
Association football forwards